The San Luis Valley short-horned lizard (Phrynosoma diminutum) is a horned lizard species native to Colorado in the United States.

References

Phrynosoma
short-horned lizard, San Luis Valley
Reptiles described in 2015